Chow On-iam (born 10 August 1951) is a Thai former footballer who competed in the 1968 Summer Olympics.

References

1951 births
Living people
Chow On-iam
Chow On-iam
Footballers at the 1968 Summer Olympics
Association footballers not categorized by position